Khazinabad (also Romanized as Khazīnābād, Khaz'anābād, Khazīnehābād, and Khuzānābād) is a village in Kuhpayeh-e Sharqi Rural District, in the Central District of Abyek County, Qazvin Province, Iran. At the 2006 census, its population was 25, in 7 families.

References 

Populated places in Abyek County